The Battle of Hornshole was a skirmish fought in 1514 between an English raiding party and youths from Hawick, as most of the town's male population had been killed at Flodden.

History
After the Battle of Flodden the previous year, around a third of the whole Scottish army had been killed, making the Borders extremely vulnerable. Youths from the town gathered weapons and set off to confront them, attacking at night and soundly defeating the raiders.

Name
The place name most likely means Heron's Hole, since there is a deep pool in the River Teviot here. Another possible meaning is Orm's Hole, after the same Anglian lord who gave his name to Ormiston, or Orm's Toun. Also possible, but less likely, is Hornie's Hole, a deep dwelling place for the Devil.

Celebration
During the battle, the pennon carried by the raiders was captured and taken as a trophy by the victors. Today, Hawick's coat of arms bears a pennon inscribed with "1514", the year of the battle.

The story of the Battle of Hornshole plays a central role in Common Riding celebrations in the town of Hawick.

References

Battles involving Scotland
Battles involving England
Hawick
1514 in England
1514 in Scotland
Battles between England and Scotland
Conflicts in 1514
History of the Scottish Borders